Entrainment is a phenomenon of the atmosphere which occurs when a turbulent flow captures a non-turbulent flow. It is typically used to refer to the capture of a wind flow of high moisture content, or in the case of tropical cyclones, the capture of drier air.

Detrainment is the opposite effect, when the air from a convective cloud, usually at its top, is injected in the environment.

Theory 

Entrainment is the mixing of environmental air into a preexisting air current or cloud so that the environmental air becomes part of the current or cloud. The entrainment coefficient in clouds is one of the most sensitive variables causing uncertainty in climate models.

Homogeneous mixing is a model that assumes that the timescale for the mixing within a cloud was short compared to the evaporation timescale. This would imply that the dry, unsaturated, environmental air would be entrained throughout the cloud before it would start to evaporate the cloud droplets. The entrainment mixing that results from this model manifests as a partial evaporation of all the drops within the cloud, but no change in the number of cloud drops.
A contrasting model of entrainment is inhomogeneous mixing. This model assumes that the time it takes to evaporate cloud drops is short compared to the mixing timescales. Therefore, the saturated air that mixes with the unsaturated environment air would completely evaporate the cloud drops within the entrained area, which would reduce the total number of cloud drops.

The major difference between the two models is how they affect the shape of the cloud drop spectrum. Homogeneous mixing changes the shape of spectrum because the supersaturation is not the same over large and small drops. Exposing a cloud to homogeneously mixed entrained air will result in a narrower cloud drop spectrum, while inhomogeneous mixing does not change the cloud drop spectrum.

Entrainment rate
Cumulus clouds have a significant impact on transport of energy and water vapor, and then influence precipitation and climate. In large scale models, cumulus clouds need to be parameterized. Entrainment rate is a key parameter in cumulus parameterization. Henry Stommel was the first to study entrainment rate in cumulus clouds.

References

Further reading
 Lu C., S. Niu, Y. Liu, A. Vogelmann, 2013: . Geophys. Res. Lett., 40, 2333-2338.
 Lu C., Y. Liu, and S. Niu, 2013: . Chin. Sci. Bull., 58, 545-551.
 Lu C., Y. Liu, S. Niu, A. Vogelmann, 2012: . Geophys. Res. Lett., 39, L20812. 
 Lu C., Y. Liu, S. Yum, S. Niu, S. Endo, 2012: . Geophys. Res. Lett., 39, L04802. 
 Lu C., Y. Liu, and S. Niu, 2014: . Chinese Sci. Bull., 59(9), 896-903.
 Lu C., Y. Liu, and S. Niu, 2011: . J. Geophys. Res., 116, D20207. 
 Burnet, F., and J.L. Brenguier, 2007: Observational Study of the Entrainment-Mixing Process in Warm Convective Clouds. J. Atmos. Sci., 64, 1995–2011.
 Chosson, F., J.L. Brenguier, and L. Schüller, 2007: Entrainment-Mixing and Radiative Transfer Simulation in Boundary Layer Clouds. J. Atmos. Sci., 64, 2670–2682.
 Hill, A.A., G. Feingold, and H. Jiang, 2009: The Influence of Entrainment and Mixing Assumption on Aerosol–Cloud Interactions in Marine Stratocumulus. J. Atmos. Sci., 66, 1450–1464.
 Hicks, E., C. Pontikis, and A. Rigaud, 1990: Entrainment and Mixing Processes as Related to Droplet Growth in Warm Midlatitude and Tropical Clouds. J. Atmos. Sci., 47, 1589–1618.
 Pontikis, C.A., and E.M. Hicks, 1993: Droplet Activation as Related to Entrainment and Mixing in Warm Tropical Maritime Clouds. J. Atmos. Sci., 50, 1888–1896.
 Baker, B.A., 1992: Turbulent Entrainment and Mixing in Clouds: A New Observational Approach. J. Atmos. Sci., 49, 387–404.
 Paluch, I.R., 1979: The Entrainment Mechanism in Colorado Cumuli. J. Atmos. Sci., 36, 2467–2478.
 Baker, M., and J. Latham, 1979: The Evolution of Droplet Spectra and the Rate of Production of Embryonic Raindrops in Small Cumulus Clouds. J. Atmos. Sci., 36, 1612–1615.
 Baker, M.B., R.G. Corbin, and J. Latham, 1980, The influence of entrainment on the evolution of cloud droplet spectra: I. A model of inhomogeneous mixing. Quarterly Journal of the Royal Meteorological Society, 106, 581-598.

Cloud and fog physics